Tarentola parvicarinata, also known as the Sierra Leone wall gecko or white-spotted wall gecko, is a species of gecko. It is native to parts of West Africa (Burkina Faso, Gambia, Guinea, Mali, Mauritania, and Senegal) and Western Sahara.

References

Tarentola
Reptiles described in 1980
Reptiles of West Africa
Reptiles of North Africa